Awaba railway station is located on the Main Northern line in New South Wales, Australia. It serves the City of Lake Macquarie town of Awaba opening on 15 August 1887.

In April 1993, the original weatherboard station building on the western platform was damaged in a fire and later demolished. It was replaced by the present lighter-weight structure.

Until its formal closure in December 1989, Awaba was the junction for the line to Wangi Power Station, the remnants of which remain behind Platform 1. North of the station are two passing loops, although the northbound one has now been disconnected.

Platforms and services

Awaba has two side platforms. It is serviced by NSW TrainLink Central Coast & Newcastle Line services travelling from Sydney Central to Newcastle.

References

External links

Awaba station details Transport for New South Wales

Railway stations in the Hunter Region
Railway stations in Australia opened in 1887
Regional railway stations in New South Wales
Short-platform railway stations in New South Wales, 4 cars
Main North railway line, New South Wales
City of Lake Macquarie